The Sugar Creek Vista Overlook is a historic scenic overlook in Ouachita National Forest. It is located on Polk County Road 64 (also once designated Forest Road 38), just south of Dicks Gap. The wall was built out of quarried novaculite stone set with grapevine mortar joints in 1935 by a crew of the Civilian Conservation Corps (CCC). It is one of only two CCC-built overlooks in the national forest, and the only one built with these particular materials.

The site was listed on the National Register of Historic Places in 2007.

See also
National Register of Historic Places listings in Polk County, Arkansas

References

National Register of Historic Places in Arkansas
Buildings and structures in Polk County, Arkansas
Ouachita National Forest
National Register of Historic Places in Polk County, Arkansas